Karl Schönböck (4 February 1909 in Vienna – 24 March 2001 in Munich) was an Austrian actor.

Selected filmography

 Flowers from Nice (1936) as Count Ulrich von Traunstein
 The Girl Irene (1936) as Sir John Corbett
 Daphne and the Diplomat (1937) as Bentley
 Anna Favetti (1938) as Kingston
 The Blue Fox (1938) as Trill
 Bismarck (1940) as Kaiser Franz Joseph
 The Big Game (1942) as Richter the photograph
 Bravo Acrobat! (1943) as Orlando
 Titanic (1943) as John Jacob Astor IV
 The Noltenius Brothers (1945) as Baron Kontakt
 Peter Voss, Thief of Millions (1946) as Bobby Dodd
 An Everyday Story (1948) as Herbert Winkler
 Don't Dream, Annette (1949) as Klaus
 The Blue Straw Hat (1949) as Paul
 Sensation in Savoy (1950) as René Rocan
 The Man in Search of Himself (1950) as Jack d'Alimonte
 My Niece Susanne (1950) as Don Manual Carcocastilla
 Taxi-Kitty (1950) as Molander
 The Forester's Daughter (1952) as Kaiser Franz Josef
 The Chaste Libertine (1952) as Dr. Fellner
 A Very Big Child (1952) as Alexander van Straaten
 We're Dancing on the Rainbow (1952) as Philip
 Hit Parade (1953) as Fred Pauli
 Lavender (1953) as Gallenberg
 Must We Get Divorced? (1953) as Prosecutor Paul
 The Night Without Morals (1953) as Philipp Weinsberg
 Fanfare of Marriage (1953) as Dobler
 The Charming Young Lady (1953) as Hektor Kranz
 Fireworks (1954) as Alexander Oberholzer
 Roses from the South (1954) as Sergius Konstantin
 The Gypsy Baron (1954) as Commander Homonay
 Her First Date (1955) as Waldemar, Mathematikprofessor
 The Congress Dances (1955) as Count Metternich
 The Bath in the Barn (1956) as Don Fernando
 Love Now, Pay Later (1959) as Von Riedendank
 You Must Be Blonde on Capri (1961)
 Fanfare of Marriage (1963)
 When Ludwig Goes on Manoeuvres (1967)
 The Long Day of Inspector Blomfield (1968)
 Pride and Vengeance (1968) as English Diplomat
 Don't Fumble, Darling (1970) as Schauspieler
 We'll Take Care of the Teachers (1970)
  (1995) as Baron von Sarau

Decorations and awards
 1979: Merit Cross 1st Class of the Order of Merit of the Federal Republic of Germany (Verdienstkreuz 1. Klasse)
 1985: Gold Film Award for outstanding service to the German film industry
 1989: Austrian Cross of Honour for Science and Art, 1st class

References

External links

Photographs and literature on Karl Schönböck

1909 births
2001 deaths
Male actors from Vienna
Austrian male film actors
Austrian male television actors
Officers Crosses of the Order of Merit of the Federal Republic of Germany
Recipients of the Austrian Cross of Honour for Science and Art, 1st class
20th-century Austrian male actors